Shopi or Šopi (South Slavic: Шопи) is a regional term, used by a group of people in the Balkans. The areas traditionally inhabited by the Shopi or Šopi is called Shopluk or Šopluk (Шоплук), a mesoregion. Most of the region is located in Western Bulgaria, with smaller parts in Eastern Serbia and Eastern North Macedonia, where the borders of the three countries meet. In 2011 census in Serbia they are registered as a separate ethnicity and 142 people declared themselves as belonging to this ethnicity.

The boundaries of the Shopluk in Bulgaria are a matter of debate, with the narrowest definition confining them only to the immediate surroundings of the City of Sofia, i.e., the Sofia Valley. The boundaries that are most commonly used overlap with the Bulgarian folklore and ethnographic regions and incorporate Central Western Bulgaria and the Bulgarian-populated areas in Serbia. It is only rarely that the Shopluk is meant to include Northwestern Bulgaria, which is the widest definition (and the one used here).

Name
According to Institute for Balkan Studies, the Shopluk was the mountainous area on the borders of Serbia, Bulgaria and North Macedonia, of which boundaries are quite vague, in Serbia the term Šop has always denoted highlanders.
Shopluk was used by Bulgarians to refer to the borderlands of Bulgaria, the inhabitants were called Shopi. In Bulgaria, the Shopi designation is currently attributed to villagers around Sofia. According to some Shopluk studies dating back to the early 20th century, the name "Shopi" comes from the staff that local people, mostly pastoralists, used as their main tool. Even today in Bulgaria one of the names of a nice wooden stick is "sopa".

Shopluk area

Western Bulgaria  (White Shopluk)
Sofia City Province (villages around Sofia, capital of Bulgaria)
Sofia Province (part of the Small Shopluk)
Pernik Province (part of the Small Shopluk)
Kyustendil Province (part of the Small Shopluk)
occasionally also the western parts of the Blagoevgrad Province as Black Shopluk
occasionally also the Montana Province
occasionally also the Vidin Province
occasionally also the Vratsa Province
Southeastern Serbia
Krajište region
Vlasina region
Northeastern North Macedonia
Northeastern statistical region
Eastern statistical region

Classification

Most of the area traditionally inhabited by the Shopi is in Bulgaria. The majority of the Shopi (those in Bulgaria, as well in the Bulgarian territories annexed by Serbia in 1919) identify as Bulgarians, those in the pre-1919 territory of Serbia - as Serbs and those in North Macedonia - as ethnic Macedonians.

The noting of Shopi as a "group" began in the 19th-century migrational waves of poor workers from the so-called Shopluk, poor areas (villages) beyond Sofia.

The Bulgarian scholars put Shopi as a subgroup of the Bulgarian ethnos.  As with every ethnographic group, the Bulgarian Academy notes, the Shopi in Bulgaria consider themselves the true and most pure of the Bulgarians, just as the mountaineers around Turnovo claim their land as true Bulgaria from time immemorial, etc.

In the 19th century, the Shopluk area was one of the centres of Bulgarian National Revival. As such, the enture region was made part of the Bulgarian Exarchate upon its establishment in 1870.

In 1875, during the tug-of-war regarding the basis of codificatin of modern Bulgarian, scholar Yosif Kovachev from Štip in Eastern Macedonia proposed that the "Middle Bulgarian" or "Shop dialect" of Kyustendil (in southwestern Bulgaria) and Pijanec (in eastern North Macedonia) be used as a basis for the Bulgarian literary language as a compromise and middle ground between what he himself referred to as  the "Northern Bulgarian" or Balkan dialect and the "Southern Bulgarian" or "Macedonian" dialect.

When traveling across Bulgaria in 1841, French scholar Jérôme-Adolphe Blanqui describes the population of the Sanjak of Niš and the Sanjak of Sofia as Bulgarian. Felix Philipp Kanitz recalled that in 1872 (during Ottoman rule), the inhabitants of the region had a Bulgarian national conscience.

By the end of the 19th century (after part of the region had been annexed by Serbia), the residents of Pirot were divided on the issue, with many in the older generation having a fondness for the Bulgarians.

According to the Czech Jireček the Shopi differed very much from the other Bulgarians in language and habits, and were regarded as a simple folk. He connected their name to the Thracian tribe of Sapsei.

The American Association for South Slavic Studies noted that the Shopi were recognized as a distinct sub-group in Bulgaria.

The rural inhabitants near Sofia were popularly claimed to be descendants of the Pechenegs. The Oxford historian C. A. Macartney studied these Shopi during the 1920s and reported that they were despised by the other inhabitants of Bulgaria for their stupidity and bestiality, and dreaded for their savagery.

In the past, some chauvinistic Yugoslav and Serbian scholars put the Šopi (also known as Šopovi) as a subgroup of the Serbian ethnos, claiming that the group is closer to Serbs. For example, Serbian ethnographer Jovan Cvijić, presented  in 1919 at the Peace Conference in Paris a study in which he had divided the Shopluk into three groups: Serbs, mixed population, and a group closer to Bulgarians.

However, Cvijić is famous for publishing a number of different sets of ethnic maps of the Balkans, e.g., in 1906, 1913 and 1918. Ethnic borders in each of them have shifted, sometimes drastically, and usually depending on the state of affairs of the day. For example, in his 1913 map, Cvijić not only defined the then border between Serbia and Bulgaria as the ethnographic boundary between the two nations, but also described all of Macedonia east of Delcevo, Strumica and Nigrita as populated by Bulgarians. It is unclear how and why ethnic boundaries on the Balkans would change so drastically in the space of only five years.

According to A. Belitch and T. Georgevitch (1919), the Shopi were a mixed Serbo-Bulgarian people in Western Bulgaria of Serbian origin. This Serbian ethnographical group, according to them, inhabited a region east of the border as far as the line Bregovo-Kula-Belogradchik-Iskrets, thence towards Radomir and to the east of Kyustendil; to the east of that limit the Serbian population, blended with the Bulgarian element, reached the Iskar banks and the line which linked it to Ihtiman.

At present, no Serbian or international linguist supports these claims, and the border between Serbian and Bulgarian is unanimously defined as the state border between the two countries, except for the districts of Bosilegrad and Dimitrovgrad, which were ceded to Serbia after World War I, where the border follows the old Serbo-Bulgarian border before 1919. For more information, see also Dialects of Serbo-Croatian.

Dialects
Shopi speak a group of related dialects that belong to the "et" (western) group of Bulgarian dialects. The dialects spoken by the Shopi are sometimes collectively referred to as Shopski (Шопски), although this is not the accepted term in Bulgarian dialectology. Instead, the Western Bulgarian dialects are divided into Southwestern, spoken in Central Western and Southwestern Bulgaria, except for the region around Sofia; Northwestern, spoken in Northwestern Bulgaria and around Sofia and Outer Northwestern, spoken along the border with Serbia and by the Bulgarian minority in the Western Outlands in Serbia.

The Torlak dialects spoken by Serbs are also classified by Bulgarian linguists as part of the Transitional Bulgarian dialect, although Serbian linguists deny this. The speech that tends to be closely associated with that term and to match the stereotypical idea of "Shopski" speech are the South-Western Bulgarian dialects which are spoken from  Rila mountain and the villages around Sofia to Danube towns such as Vidin.

People from Eastern Bulgaria also refer to those who live in Sofia as Shopi, but as a result of migration from the whole of Bulgaria, Shopski is no longer a majority dialect in Sofia. Instead, most Sofia residents speak the standard literary Bulgarian language with some elements of Shopski, which remains a  majority dialect in Sofia's villages and throughout western Bulgaria, for example the big towns and cities of: (Sofia and Pleven- transitional speech with literary Bulgarian language), Pernik, Kyustendil, Vratsa, Vidin, Montana, Dupnitsa, Samokov, Lom, Botevgrad.

The exposition below is based on Stoyko Stoykov's Bulgarian dialectology (2002, first ed. 1962), although other examples are used. It describes linguistic features which differ from standard Bulgarian. The Standard Bulgarian words and sentences are given in romanization, with no attempt at scientific transcription apart from stress marking.

Features of Shopski shared by all or most western Bulgarian dialects

Phonology

Proto-Slavic *tʲ~*dʲ (the main marker of differentiation between the different Slavic languages) has resulted in щ~жд (ʃt~ʒd) (as in Standard Bulgarian) - леща, между (lentils, between), except for the extreme western parts of the region located in Serbia and North Macedonia, where it shades into ч~дж (t͡ʃ~d͡ʒ) and шч~жџ (ʃtʃ~dʒ), which are transitional to the reflexes in standard Serbian/Macedonian.
Example: fresh milk in Shopski presno mleko (пресно млеко) compared with standard Bulgarian - prjasno mljako (прясно мляко) [as in Ekavian Serbian and Macedonian]. However, the existence of numerous cases of "a" after hardened "ц" (t͡s) indicates that the yat line in the past has run west of Vratsa, Sofia, Kyustendil and even Štip in North Macedonia.
 The verbal endings for first person singular and third person plural have no palatalisation. Example: to sit in Shopski - seda, sedǎ (седа/седъ) but in standard Bulgarian, sedjǎ (седя)
 Most dialects have little or no reduction of unstressed vowels (as in Serbian), with the exception of the Torlak dialects in Serbian, which, on the other hand, do have reduction (as in Bulgarian)
 All dialects, irrespective of which country they are located in, have dynamic stress and lack either phonetic pitch or length (as in standard Bulgarian and unlike Serbian and Macedonian)
 Historical /l/ in coda position has been preserved in all dialects, as in standard Bulgarian and unlike Serbian, where it is pronounced as o ("бил" vs. "био" [was])
 With the exception of the extreme western parts of the region located in Serbia, pronouns conform to standard Bulgarian ones (e.g. "nie" (ние) [we], "vie" (вие) [you, 2n personal plural], etc. etc. with the exception of first person singular, which is ja (я), as in Serbian, instead of az (аз), as in Bulgarian, and the third person, on (он), fem. ona (она); neut. ono (оно), pl. oni (они), as in Serbian.
 Palatalized  occurs in some cases where it is absent in the standard language.

Morphology

 There are no cases, as in most Bulgarian dialects as well as standard Bulgarian (and unlike Serbian)
 There are definite articles, as in all Bulgarian dialects as well as standard Bulgarian (and unlike Serbian)
 The old Slavic tenses have been kept in full and have been supplemented with additional (inferential) forms, as in all Bulgarian dialects as well as standard Bulgarian (and unlike Serbian)
 The comparative and superlative form of adjectives are expressed analytically, by adding "по /po/ and "най" /nay/, as in all Bulgarian dialects as well as standard Bulgarian (and unlike Serbian)
 There is only one plural form for adjectives, as in all Bulgarian dialects as well as standard Bulgarian (and unlike Serbian)
 The ending for first person plural is always -ме (-me), while in standard Bulgarian some verbs have the ending -м (-m). This feature however also appears in some Southern dialects.
The definite article for masculine nouns varies. In northwestern Bulgaria, it is ǎ (-ъ). In the Extreme Northwestern Dialects and the Torlak dialects in Serbia, it is -ǎt (-ът), as in Standard Bulgarian. In the Pirdop, Botevgrad and Ihtiman dialect, it is -a (-а). In the rest of the mesoregion, it is -o (-о) as in the Moesian dialects in northeastern Bulgaria. 
 The preposition (and prefix) u (у) is used instead of v (в). Example: "in town" is Shopski u grado (у градо) vs. standard Bulgarian v grada (в града), cf. Serbian u gradu.

Features characteristic for the South-West Bulgarian dialect group

Phonology

Example: Shopski моя/мойо маж ме лаже (moja/mojo maž me laže), че одим навонка (če odim navonka) vs standard Bulgarian моят мъж ме лъже, ще ходя навън/ка) (mojǎt mǎž me lǎže, šte hodja navǎn/ka), (my husband is lying to me, I'll be going out). However, this is not typical either for the Northwestern Bulgarian dialects which have for both the big yus or yer, nor for the Bulgarian Extreme Northwestern dialects and the Torlak dialects in Serbia, which have for yer.

Morphology

 The definite article for masculine nouns varies. In the Pirdop, Botevgrad and Ihtiman dialect, it is -a (-а). In the rest of the mesoregion, it is -o (-о) as in northeastern Bulgaria (the Moesian dialects and unlike standard Macedonian, where it is -ot (-oт). Example: Shopski otivam u grado (отивам у градо) vs standard Bulgarian otivam v grada (отивам в града), "I am going in town"
 The past passive participle ending varies, depending on participle, for example, for "married" the Northwestern Bulgarian dialects, the Bulgarian Kyustendil dialect and Maleshevo-Pirin dialect and the Timok-Luznica dialect in Serbia use -en/-jen (-ен/-йен), i.e. "женен", as in standard Bulgarian, whereas the Sofia, Tran, Dupnitsa and Elin Pelin dialects use -t (-т), i.e. "женет". In other cases, -en/-jen (-ен/-йен) is the preferred ending in most of the central and southern parts of the region, as in most southern Bulgarian, i.e. Rup dialects as well as Standard Serbian and Macedonian
 In the past aorist tense and in the past active participle the stress falls always on the ending and not on the stem. Example: Shopski gle'dah (гле'дах), gle'dal (гле'дал) vs standard Bulgarian 'gledah ('гледах), 'gledal ('гледал), "[I] was watching; [he, she, it] watched"

Features characteristic of the Sofia and Elin Pelin dialects

Morphology

 In the present tense for the first and second conjugation, the ending for the first person singular is always -м (-m) as in Serbian while in standard Bulgarian some verbs have the ending -а/я (-a/ja). Example: Shopski я седим (ja sedim) vs standard Bulgarian аз седя (az sedja) (I am sitting, we are sitting)
 In the third person singular, present tense, the ending is ат (-at), as in standard Bulgarian.
 All conjugation forms for the aorist and imperfect follow entirely the standard Bulgarian conjugation pattern, including with ending ха (-ha) for 3rd person plural for both aorist and imperfect (hu and še in Serbian, respectively)
 Most often the particle for the forming of the future tense is че (če) (Sofia dialect), ке (k'e) (Samokov dialect) or ше (še) (Elin Pelin dialect), instead of standard ще (šte). The form še is used in the more urbanized areas and is rather common in the colloquial speech of Sofia in general. Example: Shopski че одим, ше ода, ке ода/одим (ше) ода (če odim, še oda, k'е oda/odim) vs standard Bulgarian ще ходя (šte hodja) (I will be going)
 Lack of past imperfect active participle, used to form the renarrative mood. In other words, in these dialects there are forms like дал (dal), писал (pisal), мислил (mislil), пил (pil) (past aorist active participles), but no дадял (dadyal), пишел (pishel), мислел (mislel), пиел (piel).

Other features

The /x/-sound is often omitted. Despite being particularly associated with Shopski, this is actually characteristic of most rural Bulgarian dialects. Example: Shopski леб (leb), одиа (odia) vs standard Bulgarian хляб (hljab), ходиха (hodiha) (bread, they went)

Vocabulary

There are plenty of typical words for the Shop dialect in particular, as well as for other western dialects in general.
Some examples are:

Culture

The Shopi have a very original and characteristic folklore. The traditional male costume of the Shopi is white, while the female costumes are diverse. White male costumes are spread at the western Shopluk. The hats they wear are also white and tall (called gugla). Traditionally Shopi costume from the Kyustendil region are in black and they are called Chernodreshkovci — Blackcoats. Some Shope women wear a special kind of sukman called a litak, which is black, generally is worn without an apron, and is heavily decorated around the neck and bottom of the skirt in gold, often with great quantities of gold-colored sequins. Embroidery is well developed as an art and is very conservative. Agriculture is the traditional main occupation, with cattle breeding coming second.

The traditional Shop house that has a fireplace in the centre has only survived in some more remote villages, being displaced by the Middle Bulgarian type. The villages in the plains are larger, while those in the higher areas are somewhat straggling and have traditionally been inhabited by single families (zadruga). The unusually large share of placenames ending in -ovci, -enci and -jane evidence for the preservation of the zadruga until even after the 19th century.

Artistic culture

In terms of music, the Shopi have a complex folklore with the heroic epic and humor playing an important part. The Shopi are also known for playing particularly fast and intense versions of Bulgarian dances. The  gadulka; the kaval and the gaida are popular instruments; and two-part singing is common. Minor second intervals are common in Shop music and are not considered dissonant.

Two very popular and well-known fоlklore groups are Poduenski Babi and Bistrishki Babi — the Grandmothers of Poduene and Bistritsa villages.

Cuisine
A famous Bulgarian dish, popular throughout the Balkans and Central Europe is the Shopska salad, named after the ethnographic group.

Social

In the 19th century, around Vidin, it was not unusual for a woman in her mid 20s and 30s to have a man of 15–16 years.

The Shopi in literature and anecdotes

The Shopi — especially those from near Sofia — have the widespread (and arguably unjustified) reputation of stubborn and selfish people. They were considered conservative and resistant to change. There are many proverbs and anecdotes about them, more than about all other regional groups in Bulgaria.

A distinguished writer from the region is Elin Pelin who actually wrote some comic short stories and poems in the dialect, and also portrayed life in the Shopluk in much of his literary work.

Anecdotes and proverbs

 "There is nothing deeper than the Iskar River, and nothing higher than the Vitosha Mountain." (От Искаро по-длибоко нема, от Витоша по-високо нема!).
 This saying pokes fun at a perceived facet of the Shop's character, namely that he's never traveled far from his home.

 Once a Shop went to the zoo and saw a giraffe. He watched it in amazement and finally said: "There is no such animal!" (Е, те такова животно нема!)
 So even seeing the truth with his own eyes, he refuses to acknowledge it.

 Once a Shop went to the city, saw aromatic soaps on a stand and, thinking that they were something to eat, bought a piece. He began to eat it but soon his mouth was filled with foam. He said: "Foam or not, it cost money, I shall eat it." (Пеняви се, не пеняви, пари съм давал, че го ядем.)
 When money is spent, even unpleasant things should be endured.

 How was the gorge of the Iskǎr River formed? As the story goes, in ancient times the Sofia Valley was a lake, surrounded with mountains. The ancient Shopi were fishermen. One day, while fishing with his boat one of them bent over in order to take his net out of the water. But the boat was floating towards the nearby rocks on the slope of the Balkan Mountains. Consequently, the Shop hit his head on the rocks and the entire mountain split into two. The lake flew out and the gorge was formed.
 There is a saying throughout Bulgaria that the Shopi's heads are wooden (дървена шопска глава, dǎrvena šopska glava), meaning they are too stubborn. In Romania there is such saying about Bulgarians in general.

 Once upon a time three Shopi climbed on top of the Vitosha Mountain. There was a thick fog in the valley so they thought it was cotton. They jumped down and perished.
 This is to show three points: the Shopi are not very smart after all; Vitosha is very high; and, as a serious point, it is common to see Vitosha standing over low clouds shrouding the high plains and valleys of Western Bulgaria; this is a temperature inversion.

 Another example of the Shopi's stubbornness: Once, in the middle of summer, a Shop wore a very thick coat. When asked if it wasn't too hot, he answered: It's not because of the coat but because of the weather.
 The Shopi had a reputation of being good soldiers nevertheless there was a proverb: "A Shop will only fight if he can see the roof of his house from the battlefield", meaning he will only fight if he can see his personal interests in the fight. A proverb that wants to demonstrate the Shopi's selfishness, but may rather point to their conservatism, lack of interest to the outside world.
 Some Shop shepherds are said to have observed over 40 or 50 years from their meadows on the Vitosha mountain how the capital city - Sofia situated few kilometers downhill grew from 80 000 to 300 000 in the 1930s, how new buildings and parks sprang... but never took interest to go and see the city themselves.
 In other parts of Bulgaria all locals from Sofia are called, somewhat scornfully, "Shopi", although the majority of the city's population are not descendants of the real vernacular minority but of migrants from other regions.
 In addition, in other parts of Bulgaria there exists the use of the derisive form "Shopar" for Shop and "Shoparism" for untidy, outdated or primitive circumstances (which show some similarity to the employ of the term "Hillbilly" in the USA). Actually the word "shopar" in Bulgarian means "young boar" and has nothing to do with the Shopi. It is a term for untidiness, since the boar is a close relative to the pig.
 The sayings about the Shopi does not seize in modern day. There are popular sayings from communist period of Bulgaria such as:
Even if the gasoline price grows to $100 I'll still drive my car. Even if the price drops to a penny, I am not buying it still.
I will set my house on fire so the fire spread over my neighbor's barn.
They pretend to pay me decent salary; I pretend that I am working (also very common in the former USSR).
I take a look behind me – nothing; I take a look around me – nothing; and I am thinking – there is something. (It shows the paranoia of the Shop that the world is out to get him/her)
A traveler came upon two Shopi sitting in the village square. Since he was traveling to Istanbul he asked one of them for directions in English. The Shopi made a clicking sound with his mouth and shook head, I don't understand. The traveler attempted the same question in French, German, Russian, Spanish and other languages, but had the same result. Aggravated, the traveler started going in one direction that happened to be wrong. The second Shopi, observing this scene, lamented to his buddy “Ah, this guy knows so many languages and you knew none of them.” The first Shopi said “And what good did it do him?”.

Honours
Shopski Cove in Antarctica is named after the Shop region.

See also
Torlakian dialect, a transitional dialect of Serbian, Bulgarian and Macedonian.

References

Sources
Ethnologia Balkanica (2005), Vol. 9; Places to exchange cultural patterns by Petko Hristov, pp. 81-90, Journal for Southeast European Anthropology, Sofia
Stanko Žuljić, Srpski etnos i velikosrpstvo (1997), Google Books link

External links

 Traditional Shopi costumes from Sofia and the region — old photographs

Culture in Sofia
Sofia Province
Ethnic groups in North Macedonia
South Slavs
Bulgarian people by ethnographic region
Ethnic groups in Serbia